Filip Kolev (born 29 January 2001) is a Bulgarian footballer who plays as a striker for Lokomotiv Plovdiv II.

References

External links

2001 births
Living people
Bulgarian footballers
Association football midfielders
First Professional Football League (Bulgaria) players
PFC Lokomotiv Plovdiv players
PFC Spartak Varna players